Thomas Fraser (1749 – October 18, 1821) was a soldier and political figure in Upper Canada.

He was born in Stratherrick, Inverness, Scotland in 1749. His family came to North America in 1767 and settled on the estate of Sir William Johnson in Tryon County, New York. In 1777, he and his brother were captured while trying to escape to Quebec. They escaped and joined Major-General John Burgoyne at Fort Edward. After the fall of Saratoga, they escaped north to Quebec. In 1779, they served as border guards at the Yamaska River and later became Lieutenants in Edward Jessup's Loyal Rangers.

In 1784, he settled in Edwardsburg Township, where he built a sawmill. In 1786, he became a justice of the peace and, in 1792, was appointed to the land board for Leeds and Grenville counties. He was also the first sheriff in the Johnstown District. He represented Dundas in the 2nd Parliament of Upper Canada and Glengarry in the 5th Parliament.

During the War of 1812, he commanded the Dundas County Militia, and was in command of all Canadian Militia at the Battle of Ogdensburg. After the war, he moved to Matilda Township in Dundas County. He was appointed to the Legislative Council for the province in 1815. He died in Matilda Township in 1821.

External references
Biography at the Dictionary of Canadian Biography Online
Glengarry's Representatives in the Legislative Assembly of Upper Canada

1749 births
1821 deaths
Members of the Legislative Assembly of Upper Canada
Members of the Legislative Council of Upper Canada
United Empire Loyalists
People from Leeds and Grenville United Counties
People from Inverness
Scottish emigrants to pre-Confederation Ontario
Immigrants to the Province of Quebec (1763–1791)